Soulero may refer to:

 Soulero, an album by Eddie Higgins
 "Soulero", a song by Bob James and Richard Evans from the former's album One

See also
 Solero (disambiguation)